The Alltech Arena is a 5,517-seat multi-purpose arena in Lexington, Kentucky. The facility, named for the title sponsor Alltech, opened on the grounds of the Kentucky Horse Park in July 2009. It was originally constructed for the 2010 FEI World Equestrian Games.

The arena is owned by the Commonwealth of Kentucky and is managed by the Kentucky Horse Park. The arena is currently home to KHSAA State Wrestling Tournament, the Alltech National Horse Show, and numerous equestrian related events.

Sports 

The arena was the home of the Bluegrass Warhorses of the Continental Indoor Football League during the team's only season in 2014.

References

External links 
 Official site of the Kentucky Horse Park
 Alltech Arena Event Calendar
 2010 FEI World Equestrian Games

 

2009 establishments in Kentucky
Convention centers in Kentucky
Event venues established in 2009
Sports venues in Lexington, Kentucky
Sports venues completed in 2009
Equestrian venues in the United States
Indoor arenas in Kentucky